Park Lake is an unincorporated community in Osceola County, Michigan, United States.

Sharon Malcolm (1947-2019), West Virginia politician, was born in Park Lake.

Notes

Unincorporated communities in Osceola County, Michigan
Unincorporated communities in Michigan